Dennis Waidner (born 8 February 2001) is a German footballer who plays as a right-back for Regionalliga Bayern club SpVgg Unterhaching.

Career
On 1 September 2022, Waidner joined Regionalliga Bayern club SpVgg Unterhaching from recently relegated Würzburger Kickers. He made his debut the following day, coming on as a substitute in the 75th minute for Max Lamby in a 2–1 home loss to SpVgg Hankofen-Hailing.

Career statistics

References

2001 births
Living people
German footballers
People from Günzburg
Sportspeople from Swabia (Bavaria)
Footballers from Bavaria
Association football defenders
3. Liga players
Regionalliga players
SSV Ulm 1846 players
FC Bayern Munich footballers
FC Bayern Munich II players
Würzburger Kickers players
SpVgg Unterhaching players